Horst Vetter (28 August 1927 – 27 August 2022) was a German politician. A member of the Free Democratic Party, he served in the Abgeordnetenhaus of Berlin from 1971 to 1986.

Vetter died on 27 August 2022, at the age of 94.

References

1927 births
2022 deaths
20th-century German politicians
German businesspeople
Members of the Abgeordnetenhaus of Berlin
Free Democratic Party (Germany) politicians
Politicians from Berlin
Commanders Crosses of the Order of Merit of the Federal Republic of Germany